Pipe Creek may refer to the following places in the United States:
A watercourse:
Pipe Creek (S. Fork San Jacinto River), a stream in Riverside County, California
Pipe Creek (Wabash River), a stream in Indiana
Pipe Creek (White River), a stream in Indiana
Pipe Creek (Texas), a stream in Bandera County, Texas
 or one of 23 other streams in the United States

A place:
Pipe Creek, Texas, an unincorporated community in Bandera County
Pipe Creek Township, Madison County, Indiana, a township
Pipe Creek Township, Miami County, Indiana, a township
Pipe Creek Sinkhole, a paleontological site in Grant County, Indiana

See also

Double Pipe Creek, a tributary of the Monocacy River in Maryland